Emeka Ilione (born 20 March 2002) is an English rugby union player for Leicester Tigers in Premiership Rugby, his preferred position is back row.

Career
Ilione was born in Mansfield, Nottinghamshire and attended Nottingham High School where he took up rugby at age 11, before attending Rugby School where he was head boy. He joined Leicester Tigers academy at under 13s. In 2021 his potential was highlighted by Maro Itoje naming him in a theoretical British-Nigerians XV.

Ilione was offered a professional contract with Leicester in the summer of 2022, making his club debut on 29 March 2022 in a Premiership Rugby Cup match against London Irish at Welford Road.  He made his Premiership league debut- on 7 January 2023 as a 79th minute replacement against Newcastle Falcons, and a week later made his European Rugby Champions Cup debut on 13 January 2023 in a win at ASM Clermont Auvergne.

Ilione balances his professional rugby career with studying medicine at Nottingham University.

References

2002 births
Living people
English rugby union players
Leicester Tigers players
Nottingham R.F.C. players
Rugby union flankers
Rugby union players from Nottingham